The 1991 European Amateur Team Championship took place 26–30 June at Real Club de la Puerta de Hierro in Madrid, Spain. It was the 17th men's golf European Amateur Team Championship.

Venue 

The hosting club was established in 1895 as a polo club. Its first 18-hole golf course, located in the northwest of Madrid, Spain, in the district of Moncloa, 5 kilometres from the city center, designed by Harry Colt, opened in 1914. Tom Simpson designed a new 9-hole course in the 1940s and John Harris designed another nine holes in 1968. The two 18-hole courses at Puerta de Hierro had previously hosted the Open de España and Madrid Open on the European Tour and the 1970 Eisenhower Trophy.

Format 
Each team consisted of six players, playing two rounds of stroke-play over two days, counting the five best scores each day for each team.

The eight best teams formed flight A, in knock-out match-play over the next three days. The teams were seeded based on their positions after the stroke play. The first placed team were drawn to play the quarter final against the eight placed team, the second against the seventh, the third against the sixth and the fourth against the fifth. Teams were allowed to use six players during the team matches, selecting four of them in the two morning foursome games and five players in to the afternoon single games. Games all square at the 18th hole were declared halved, if the team match was already decided.

The seven teams placed 9–15 in the qualification stroke-play formed flight B and the four teams placed 16–19 formed flight C, to play similar knock-out play, to decide their final positions.

Teams 
19 nation teams contested the event. Each team consisted of six players.

Players in the leading teams

Other participating teams

Winners 
Team England won the opening 36-hole stroke-play qualifying competition, with a 5-under-par score of 715, six strokes ahead of host nation Spain.

There was no official award for the lowest individual score, but individual leader was Liam White, England, with a 6-under-par score of 138, two strokes ahead of nearest competitors.

Team England won the gold medal, earning their eighth title, beating team Italy in the final 5–2.

The Netherlands, for the first time on the podium in the  history of the championship, earned the bronze on third place, after beating Scotland 4–3 in the bronze match.

Results 
Qualification round

Team standings

* Note: In the event of a tie the order was determined by the best total of the two non-counting scores of the two rounds.

Individual leaders

 Note: There was no official award for the lowest individual score.

Flight A

Bracket

Final games

* Note: Game declared halved, since team match already decided.

Flight B

Bracket

Flight C

Final standings

Sources:

See also 
 Eisenhower Trophy – biennial world amateur team golf championship for men organized by the International Golf Federation.
 European Ladies' Team Championship – European amateur team golf championship for women organised by the European Golf Association.

References

External links 
 European Golf Association: Full results

European Amateur Team Championship
Golf tournaments in Spain
European Amateur Team Championship
European Amateur Team Championship
European Amateur Team Championship